Nothosaurus ("false lizard", from the Ancient Greek , "illegitimate", and , "lizard") is an extinct genus of sauropterygian reptile from the Triassic period, approximately 240–210 million years ago, with fossils being distributed from North Africa and Europe to China. It is the best known member of the nothosaur order.

Description
 
Nothosaurus was a semi-oceanic animal which probably had a lifestyle similar to that of today's seals. When swimming, Nothosaurus would use its tail, legs, and webbed feet to propel and steer it through the water. The skull was broad and flat, with long jaws, lined with needle teeth, it probably caught fish and other marine creatures. Trackways attributed, partly by process of elimination, to a nothosaur, that were reported from Yunnan, China in June 2014, were interpreted as the paddle impressions left as the animals dug into soft seabed with rowing motions of their paddles, churning up hidden benthic creatures that they snapped up. Once caught, few animals would be able to shake themselves free from the mouth of Nothosaurus.

In many respects its body structure resembled that of the much later plesiosaurs, but it was not as well adapted to an aquatic environment.

Species

There are nearly a dozen known species of Nothosaurus. The type species is N. mirabilis, named in 1834 from the Germanic Muschelkalk. Other species include N. giganteus (previously known as Paranothosaurus) from Osnabrück, Germany; N. juvenilis, also from Germany; N. edingerae from the Upper Muschelkalk and Lower Keuper; N. haasi and N. tchernovi from Makhtesh Ramon, Israel; N. cymatosauroides from the Spanish Muschelkalk; N. jagisteus from the Upper Muschelkalk of Hohenlohe, Germany; and N. youngi, N. yangjuanensis (and its junior synonym N. rostellatus) and the recently named N. zhangi from Guizhou, China. Several species have been described from the Lower Muschelkalk in Winterswijk, the Netherlands, including N. marchicus (and its junior synonym N. winterswijkensis) and N. winkelhorsti. Recently, the long considered lost type material of N. schimperi Meyer, 1842 from the Lower Muschelkalk of Soultz-les-Bains, Alsace, France, has been rediscovered and a lectotype has been designated.

Klein and Albers (2009) conducted a phylogenetic analysis, but did not test the monophyly of Nothosaurus, as other nothosaurids were not included in their analysis.

Several other species have been named but are now generally considered invalid. One such species, N. procerus, is now considered a junior subjective synonym of N. marchicus. Other species now considered junior synonyms of N. marchicus include N. crassus, N. oldenburgi, N. raabi, N. schroderi, N. venustus and the recently named N. winterswijkensis. Junior synonyms of  N. giganteus, the second largest Nothosaurus species, include N. andriani, N. angustifronis, N. aduncidens, N. baruthicus and N. chelydrops.

A species level phylogenetic analysis of Nothosauridae was performed by Liu et al. (2014), and included all known valid species of the family and Nothosaurus apart from Lariosaurus stensioi (type of Micronothosaurus), Nothosaurus cymatosauroides, and Ceresiosaurus lanzi. Due to the inclusion of other nothosaurids other than Nothosaurus, the monophyly of Nothosaurus was tested for the first time. The analysis found both Lariosaurus and Nothosaurus to be polyphyletic in regard to each other and all the other genera of the family, making a systematic revision of these two genera necessary. Below, their results are shown with type species of named nothosaurid genera noted. Later, in 2017, the species N. juvenilis, N. youngi, and N. winkelhorsti were formally moved to Lariosaurus.

References
 Parker, Steve. Dinosaurus: the complete guide to dinosaurs. Firefly Books Inc, 2003. Pg. 384

General references

 Dixon, Dougal (2006). The Complete Book of Dinosaurs. Hermes House.
 Haines, Tim, and Paul Chambers. The Complete Guide to Prehistoric Life. Pg. 64. Canada: Firefly Books Ltd., 2006

Triassic reptiles of Asia
Triassic reptiles of Europe
Nothosaurs
Triassic sauropterygians
Triassic reptiles of Africa
Early Triassic first appearances
Olenekian genera
Anisian genera
Ladinian genera
Carnian genera
Norian genus extinctions
Sauropterygian genera